V. "Valhalla" Vale (born February 4, 1944) is an American editor, writer, interviewer, musician and, as Vale Hamanaka, was keyboardist for the initial configuration of Blue Cheer, before it became famous as a power trio. He is the publisher and primary contributor to books and magazines published by his company, RE/Search Publications. Vale is the host of the television talk show Counter Culture Hour on Public-access television cable TV channel 29 in San Francisco. The show is edited by his partner Marian Wallace. Vale is Japanese American.

Early life
Vale was born on January 30, 1944 at the Jerome War Relocation Center to actor Kiyoshi Conrad Hamanaka and Mary Takaoka of the Vaudeville group Taka Sisters (Myrtle, Mary, Midi). The Taka Sisters broke up after the murder of Vale's aunt Midi Taka in 1936. Vale has two younger half-sisters; musician/singer Lionelle Hamanaka, and children's author and illustrator Sheila Hamanaka.

By 1966 Vale received a bachelor's degree in English Literature at University of California, Berkeley and moved to Haight-Ashbury. In 1970, he moved to an apartment in North Beach, where he continues to live today.

Publishing
In 1977, while working at City Lights Bookstore, with $100 donated each by Allen Ginsberg and Lawrence Ferlinghetti, he began publication of Search and Destroy, a San Francisco-based zine documenting the then-current punk subculture. In 1980, he began publication of RE/Search, a tabloid format zine focusing on various counterculture and underground topics, with financial help from Geoff Travis of Rough Trade Records and actress/film director Betty Thomas. At the same time he also started his own typesetting business, allowing for a day job to fund his publishing exploits and guaranteeing high quality typography and design for his magazines and books.

The 1980s saw the expansion of RE/Search books from tabloid-formatted zines to academically-modeled books. Vale published and contributed to many books on the subjects of pranks, obscure music and films, industrial culture, authors J. G. Ballard and William S. Burroughs, modern primitives, and many other underground topics.  In 1991, Vale sold his typography business to focus on publishing full-time.

Vale, influenced by and well read in cultural anthropology, describes his focus for writing: (I have) "this weird theory that there's only 1000 interesting people on this planet that I refer to as primary source thinkers. It's my job to find them. I'm just after something that lasts longer, not 'high sugar fluff' as Henry Rollins put it. I want something I don't get right away. One of my favorite phrases, and I heard this from William Burroughs, is 'belief is the enemy of knowledge'."

Along with writing and distributing, Vale tours nationally giving talks about his career and provides guidance to DIY and Indie artists about book publishing. In 2012, Henry Rollins interviewed Vale at LA ZineFest.

Newsletter 
As of 2017, both artist and musician Florian-Ayala Fauna and science fiction author Bruce Sterling are sponsors for V. Vale's RE/Search newsletter.

Recordings 
During the coronavirus pandemic, Vale began to record songs with his wife, Marian Wallace. He played the Yamaha spinet piano. Wallace sang and produced the songs. This resulted in a 12-track digital album, Lockdown Lullabies, was released in 2020. The album production was covered by the San Francisco Chronicle.

Media

 Vale is featured in the 2016 nerd culture documentary Traceroute by Johannes Grenzfurthner, a frequent collaborator of RE/Search.
 Vale is one of the interview subjects in William S. Burroughs: A Man Within.

References

External links

 RE/Search Publications
 V. Vale interviewed on the R.U. Sirius Show on 2/7/2006
 V. Vale interviewed on the R.U. Sirius Show on 11/12/05

1944 births
American writers of Japanese descent
Japanese-American internees
Blue Cheer members
Living people
UC Berkeley College of Letters and Science alumni
People from Drew County, Arkansas
Writers from Arkansas
Writers from San Francisco
20th-century American writers
21st-century American writers
Punk writers